is a Japanese author and illustrator, best known for his mangas Golden Prince and Argent King (2008) and Love Soul (2012).

References

Living people
Manga artists
Year of birth missing (living people)